There Will Be No Intermission is the third solo studio album by American musician Amanda Palmer. It was released on March 8, 2019, through Cooking Vinyl. It was crowdfunded through Patreon and recorded by Palmer in collaboration with John Congleton over the course of a month. It was supported by a 2019–2020 tour. The vinyl version of the album was released on March 29, 2019.

Background
Palmer stated that "Most of these songs were exercises in survival. This isn't really the record that I was planning to make. But loss and death kept happening in real-time, and these songs became my therapeutic arsenal of tools for making sense of it all." She also said that "The kind of stories that I'm sharing on this record—abortion, miscarriage, cancer, grief, the darker sides of parenthood—have been therapeutic and frightening to write."

Promotion
The demos of "Bigger on the Inside" (originally featuring Zoë Keating), "The Thing About Things", "A Mother's Confession", "Machete", "Drowning in the Sound", and "Judy Blume" were all released as promotional singles on March 9, 2015, May 26, 2015, February 25, 2016, March 9, 2016, August 31, 2017, and February 12, 2018, respectively. "Judy Blume" and "Look Mummy, No Hands" were previously included on the 2013 live album An Evening with Neil Gaiman & Amanda Palmer. "Judy Blume" also received a music video on February 12, 2019.

"The Ride" (originally released as a Patron-exclusive video on October 26, 2017) was previewed with a performance on NPR's All Things Considered on February 13, 2019.

Singles
The studio version of "Drowning in the Sound" was released as the first official single from the album along with the album pre-order on December 11, 2018. A music video was released on August 8, 2019.

"Voicemail for Jill" was released as the second single on February 19, 2019. A music video for the song was released on March 7, 2019.

Reception

The album has received a score of 78/100 from media aggregate site Metacritic based on 11 reviews, indicating "generally favorable reviews."

Track listing
All songs written by Amanda Palmer, except where noted

Personnel
Taken from the album's liner notes.

Musicians
Amanda Palmer — vocals, piano, ukulele, organ, synths
Crystal Brooke Alforque — violin (Track 12)
Laurann Angel — violin, viola
Jherek Bischoff — double bass, guitar, vibraphone, prepared piano, sub bass synth, cymbals, bass drum, backing vocals
John Congleton — drums, synths, sequencing
Madeline Falcone — violin, viola
Nicole Garcia — violin, viola
April Guthrie — cello
Max Henry — synths
Paris Hurley — violin, viola
Rachel Iba — violin, viola
Jodie Landau — vibraphone, glockenspiel
Aniela Marie Perry — cello
Joey Waronker — drums
Jason Webley — accordion
The "Baby Didn't Die" Choir: Anthony Palacios, Carly D. Weckstein, Charlotte Kaufman, David Goren, Ian Michaels, Jherek Bischoff, Joy Craig, Kale Chase, Lisa Schneider, Marvel Star de la Cruz, Michelle Gibson, Paul Bellatoni, Phoebe Pinder, Sara Bartel, Simon Vance, Theresa Richardson, Vanessa Rodriguez, Xine Trevino

Technical
Amanda Palmer — writer (Tracks 1-17, 19-20)
Jherek Bischoff — instrumental arrangement and mixing (all instrumental interludes), string arrangement (Track 12), recording (vibraphone, double bass, sub bass synth, cymbals, bass drum, and glockenspiel)
Greg Calbi — mastering
John Congleton — producer, mixing, engineer
Ben Folds — "songwriting help" (Track 4)
Tyler Karmen — studio assistant
Dillie Keane — writer (Track 18)
Jaron Luksa — recording (Track 12), violin, violin, and cello recording

Artwork
Allan Amato — sleeve photography
Regina Harris — stylist for insert photography
Kahn & Selesnick — insert photography
Andrew Nelson — album artwork designer
"Piano Stewards": Ngo'e Crossan, Julias Ross Bright, Philip Marshall, Nico Deslis, Joe Yarabek, Ben Ranes
"Library Department": Justine Marzack, Ash Gaiman

Tour

Throughout 2019 and 2020, Palmer embarked on the There Will Be No Intermission World Tour. The over four-hour long show featureed a mix of both songs and storytelling themed around Palmer's personal life. The Los Angeles performance, as well as the December 13 and 14th London shows, were recorded exclusively for her Patrons on Patreon. On March 14, 2019, Palmer performed a three-hour excerpt of There Will Be No Intermission at Central Presbyterian Church, as part of the SXSW Music Festival.

Tour dates

Set list
The following represents the May 11, 2019 filmed performance in Los Angeles. It does not represent all dates throughout the tour.

Act I
Judy Blume
Runs In the Family
The Thing About Things
Bigger on the Inside
Oasis
Part of Your World
Machete
A Mother’s Confession

Act II
Coin-Operated Boy
The Killing Type
Drowning in the Sound
Voicemail For Jill
Let It Go
The Ride

Charts

See also

 Music videos for this album

References

External links
 Official album website

2019 albums
Amanda Palmer albums
Cooking Vinyl albums
Crowdfunded albums